Liolaemus ruibali, also known as Ruibal's tree iguana, is a species of lizard in the family Iguanidae. It is endemic to the Andes of Argentina in northern Mendoza and southern San Juan provinces.

References

ruibali
Lizards of South America
Reptiles of Argentina
Endemic fauna of Argentina
Reptiles described in 1961
Taxa named by Roberto Donoso-Barros